Karen Marcano (born 27 July 1979) is a Venezuelan ten-pin bowler. In 2008 she finished first in the Women's World Ranking Masters. In 2009 she won a gold medal at the Pan American Bowling Confederation Championships in San Juan, Puerto Rico.  She also won the bronze medal at the masters event of the World Games in 2013 in Colombia.

World Tenpin Bowling Championships
In the 2013 combined WTBA World Championships in Henderson, Nevada, Karen teamed up with her sister Alicia Marcano.  The sisters led the doubles qualifying round with a 2,880 total and a 240 average. Only 21 pins separated them from the World Championships record. However, according to the format of the games, the first-place finisher in the TV semifinals will face the fourth-place finisher from the US duo. They were defeated by the Americans and were forced to settle for bronze with Australia.  They also won the team bronze medal at the event.

Games in the Continent
She won two gold medals in masters at Pan American Bowling Confederation Men's Championships (PABCON) Women's and Central American Games in 2010. 
In 2011 Karen and Amleto Monacelli won the gold medal for the country at PABCON Champion of Champions. She accumulated five medals in the Bolivarian Games, in total Karen has 11 individual titles on the continent.

She finished in 9th position of the combined rankings at the 2006 AMF World Cup.

Accolades
 Bronze medal in doubles at 2015 Pan American Games
 Rolled 300 game at 2015 World Bowling Women's Championships
 Two bronze medals in doubles and team at 2013 World Bowling Women's Championships
 Bronze medal in singles at 2013 World Games
 Bronze medal in singles at 2011 Pan American Games
 Gold medal in Masters at 2010 PABCON Women's Championships
 Gold medal Singles and two bronze medals in trios and Masters at 2009 PABCON Women's Championships
 Gold medal in trios and bronze medal in doubles at 2005 PABCON Women's Championships
 Bronze medals in singles and team at 2001 PABCON Women's Championships

Other Accomplishments and Awards

 Runner-up at 2015 PWBA/PBA Tomball Southwest Open
 2014 Venezuelan national champion
 2006 and 2014 South American Games champion
 2001, 2009 and 2010 Pan American champion
 2006 and 2010 Central American champion
 Runner-up at 2008 Women's World Ranking Masters
 Four-time Venezuela Bowler of the Year

Other Titles

 Sur American Games Masters Champion
 Sur American Championship Masters Champion
 Pre-Olimpics Event Masters Champion 2x
 Alba Games Masters Champion
 Tournament of La Raza Masters Champion 2x
 Tournament of La Raza Masters Champion
 World Games "Buena voluntad" Masters Champion

References

Living people
Bowlers at the 2011 Pan American Games
1979 births
Venezuelan ten-pin bowling players
Place of birth missing (living people)
Bowlers at the 2015 Pan American Games
Pan American Games medalists in bowling
Pan American Games bronze medalists for Venezuela
Competitors at the 2013 World Games
World Games bronze medalists
World Games medalists in bowling
Central American and Caribbean Games gold medalists for Venezuela
Competitors at the 2006 Central American and Caribbean Games
Competitors at the 2010 Central American and Caribbean Games
South American Games gold medalists for Venezuela
South American Games medalists in bowling
Competitors at the 2014 South American Games
Competitors at the 2018 South American Games
Bowlers at the 2019 Pan American Games
Central American and Caribbean Games medalists in bowling
Medalists at the 2011 Pan American Games
Medalists at the 2015 Pan American Games
20th-century Venezuelan women
21st-century Venezuelan women